George Louis Paul Sémichon (born 25 September 1865, date of date unknown) was a French sailor who represented his country at the 1900 Summer Olympics in Meulan, France. Semichon, as helmsman, took the 6th place in first race of the 0 to 0.5 ton and finished 6th in the second race.

Further reading

References

External links

1865 births
Year of death missing
French male sailors (sport)
Sailors at the 1900 Summer Olympics – 0 to .5 ton
Olympic sailors of France
Place of death missing
Sportspeople from Paris